Bernard Hartigan (born 1943) is an Irish retired hurler who played as a midfielder for the Limerick senior team.

Hartigan made his first appearance for the team during the 1964 championship and was a regular member of the starting for the next decade. During that time he won one All-Ireland medal, two Munster medals and one National Hurling League medal.

At club level, Hartigan was a one-time county football championship medalist with Old Christians.

Hartigan's brother, Pat, was also an All-Ireland medalist with Limerick.

References

1943 births
Living people
Old Christians hurlers
Limerick inter-county hurlers
Munster inter-provincial hurlers
All-Ireland Senior Hurling Championship winners
Hurling selectors